The Best of Spandau Ballet is a greatest hits album by English new wave band Spandau Ballet, released on 16 September 1991 by Chrysalis Records. It features all of the band's singles between 1980 and 1989 in chronological order of release.

Track listing
"To Cut a Long Story Short" – 3:21 from Journeys to Glory
"The Freeze" – 3:31 from Journeys to Glory
"Muscle Bound" – 3:54 from Journeys to Glory
"Chant No. 1 (I Don't Need This Pressure On)" – 4:04 from Diamond
"Paint Me Down" – 3:42 from Diamond
"She Loved Like Diamond" – 2:55 from Diamond
"Instinction" – 3:33 from Diamond
"Lifeline" – 3:19 from True
"Communication" – 3:25 from True
"True" – 5:32 from True
"Gold" – 3:50 from True
"Only When You Leave" – 4:47 from Parade
"I'll Fly for You" – 5:10 from Parade
"Highly Strung" – 4:10 from Parade
"Round and Round" – 4:32 from Parade
"Fight for Ourselves" – 4:22 from Through the Barricades
"Through the Barricades" – 5:16 from Through the Barricades
"How Many Lies" – 4:34 from Through the Barricades
"Raw" – 3:47 from Heart Like a Sky
"Be Free with Your Love" – 4:36 from Heart Like a Sky

Notes
 The CD version omits "She Loved Like Diamond" and "Raw".

Charts

References

1991 greatest hits albums
Chrysalis Records compilation albums
Spandau Ballet albums